École Française de Bratislava ( or Francúzska škola v Bratislave) is a French international school in Bratislava, Slovakia.

The school serves maternelle (Kindergarten), élémentaire (Elementary), collège (Middle school) and lycée (High school) levels, from 2 to 18 years old (meaning from Kindergarten to High school).

References

External links

  École Française de Bratislava
  Francúzska škola Bratislava

International schools in Slovakia
Bratislava
Schools in Bratislava